State Route 159 (SR 159) is a south–north state highway in the south-central part of the U.S. state of Georgia. Its routing is in portions of Turner and Wilcox counties.

Route description
SR 164 begins at an intersection with US 41/SR 7 in Ashburn It has an interchange with Interstate 75 (I-75) just before leaving town. It heads northeast until it meets a concurrency with SR 90. It heads north to the town of Pitts, where it meets its northern terminus, an intersection with US 280/SR 30.

Major intersections

See also

References

External links

 
 Georgia Roads (Routes 141 - 160)

159
Transportation in Turner County, Georgia
Transportation in Wilcox County, Georgia